Lord (sometimes stylized as LORD) is a heavy metal band from Wollongong, Australia. The group began as a solo project for "Lord Tim" Grose of Dungeon in 2003 and expanded into a complete band when Dungeon broke up in 2005. LORD has appeared with major acts that include Queensrÿche, Nightwish, Nevermore, Saxon and Gamma Ray. The band's name is usually stylised in all capital letters.

History
Between 1988 and 2000, Dungeon singer/guitarist and founding member "Lord Tim" Grose had collected a number of compositions he felt were either too personal to submit to the band or inappropriate for its style. In 2003, he collected these songs on an album called A Personal Journey that was issued under the name LORD. At the end of 2005, Dungeon came to an end and LORD became a band featuring Grose and drummer Tim Yatras (also of Dungeon), along with guitarist Mav Stevens and bass player Andy Dowling from Brisbane metal band Sedition. Yatras has also been a member of several black metal bands including Nazxul, Austere and Battalion. A Personal Journey was re-mastered and released to mark the occasion.

LORD performed their first live show on 31 March 2006. The group launched a national tour within months and before the end of the year had opened for Queensrÿche, Nevermore, Gamma Ray, Leaves Eyes, Atrocity and Skinless, and appeared at the final Metal for the Brain festival. On 23 December 2006, it was announced that guitarist Stevens would be leaving the band for personal reasons and would be relocating to the United Kingdom. Shane Linfoot of Sydney band Transcending Mortality filled in as a live guitarist in early 2007 but due to both bands' hectic schedules, Linfoot departed to be replaced by FromBeyond guitarist Mark Furtner, originally in a temporary capacity but his addition was made permanent in December 2007. Furtner's work had already appeared on the August 2007 album Ascendence. Chris Brooks also contributed guest guitars by way of the solos in "Rain" and "Through the Fire".

The band toured the Australian east coast with Saxon in May 2008. After this Lord began working on a third album. The EP "Hear No Evil" appeared in late 2008, featuring two new songs, live tracks and a cover of Kylie Minogue's "On a Night Like This". The Set in Stone album was released in September 2009 and included guest contributions from Craig Goldy of Dio, Glen Drover of Eidolon, Pete Lesperance of Harem Scarem, Angra's Felipe Andreoli, Vanishing Point's Chris Porcianko, Justin Sayers from Platinum Brunette, Chris Brooks, and Stu Marshall of Paindivision. Lord completed wide-scale touring of Australia, New Zealand and Japan in 2009.

In June 2009, Tim Yatras left the band and was replaced by Damian Costas from Sydney band Vanquish. During January 2010, Lord Tim announced that a medical condition had severely restricted his guitar-playing and was advised to take at least six months off from playing guitar. Temporary guitarist, Matthew Bell, filled in during his recovery.

In September 2010, LORD released the "Return of the Tyrant" EP which featured a ten-minute-long orchestrated title track and six unplugged versions of Dungeon and LORD songs, with a playing time of nearly an hour. This was followed by their fourth studio album Digital Lies in 2013.

Fallen Idols, the band's fifth full-length album and their first in six years, was released in Australia in August 2019, by the band's own label Dominus. Drummer Tim Yatras returns as a session member for this album. The album's first single and music video "United (Welcome Back)" was released in February 2019. Fallen Idols hit the Australian Artist Album Charts at #20.

Following the success of Fallen Idols, bassist Andy Dowling started a 10-part podcast series titled "Nod to the Old School", "all about the old school generation mixtape and metal compilations." Guests who had participated in the podcast include Andy LaRocque (King Diamond), David Ellefson (Megadeth), Johnny Dee (Doro), and Lord Tim, among others.

In 2021 the released a covers album entitles Undercovers Vol.1. It once again hit the Australian Artist Album Chart this time at #7 and the Independent Australian Album Charts at #1. The Album was released to showcase all of Lords cover songs that they have recorded over the years, and to bring them all together on one release. This was to give fans the opportunity to maybe hear a song for the first time that may have been on a particular countries exclusive release. The Album also showcased a few new cover songs including To the Moon and Back by Savage Garden and Reckless by Judas Priest.

Members

Current
Lord Tim – lead vocals, guitar, keyboards
Andy Dowling – bass, vocals
Mark Furtner – guitar, vocals
Past
 Mav Stevens (2005–2006) – guitars, vocals
 Shane Linfoot (live only, 2007) – guitar
Tim Yatras (2005–2009, 2019) – drums, vocals
 Damian Costas (2009 – 2014) – drums
 Matthew Bell (live only, 2010) – guitar
Simon Batley (live only, 2013- 2014) – drums 
Darryl Murphy (live only, 2016- 2018) – drums

Discography

Studio albums

Live albums

Compilation albums

EPs

Awards and nominations

AIR Awards
The Australian Independent Record Awards (commonly known informally as AIR Awards) is an annual awards night to recognise, promote and celebrate the success of Australia's Independent Music sector.

! 
|-
| 2022
| Undercovers Vol.1
| Best Independent Heavy Album or EP
| 
|

References

External links

 Official links
 Lord.net.au – official website
 Lord at MySpace
 Official Lord channel at YouTube
 Lord at Metal-Archives

 Other links

 

Musical groups established in 2003
New South Wales musical groups
Australian heavy metal musical groups
Australian power metal musical groups